This is the discography for Dutch electronic musician Nicky Romero.

Compilation albums

Extended plays

Singles

As lead artist 

Notes

As Monocule

As featured artist

Promotional singles

Free releases 
2012
 Freaky (with Fedde Le Grand)
 Slacking (with Fedde Le Grand featuring MC Gee)

Remixes 
2008
 Prunk Le Funk – Chronology (Nicky Romero Remix)

2009
 Mell Tierra and Sebastian D featuring Stanford – Maximize (Nicky Romero Remix)
 Steff Da Campo vs. Ecoustic featuring Lady Rio – Freakybeatza (Nicky Romero and Praia Del Sol Remix)
 Sidney Samson and Tony Cha Cha – Get on the Floor (Nicky Romero Remix)
 DJ Jean – Play That Beat (Nicky Romero Mix)
 Pizetta featuring Reagadelica – Klezmer (Nicky Romero Remix)
 Quintino featuring Mitch Crown – Heaven (Nicky Romero Remix)
 Firebeatz and Apster – Skandelous (Nicky Romero Remix)
 DJ Rose – Twisted (Nicky Romero Remix)
 Quintin vs. DJ Jean – Original Dutch (Nicky Romero Remix)
 Michael Mendoza featuring I Fan – Be Without You (Nicky Romero Remix)
 DJ Jose – Like That (Nicky Romero Bigroom Remix)

2010
 Ian Carey featuring Michelle Shellers – Keep on Rising (Nicky Romero Remix)
 Hardwell and Funkadelic – Get Down Girl (Nicky Romero Remix)
 Sol Noir – Superstring (Nicky Romero Remix)
 Sivana – Confusion (Nicky Romero Radio Edit)
 Grooveyard – Mary Go Wild (Nicky Romero Remix)
 Housequake – People Are People (Nicky Romero Remix)
 Fedde Le Grand featuring Mitch Crown – Rockin' High (Nicky Romero Remix)
 DJ Jesus Luz and Alexandra Prince – Dangerous (Nicky Romero Festival Mix)
 Ned Shepard – Chromatic (Nicky Romero & Nilson Remix)
 Green Velvet – Flash (Nicky Romero Remix)

2011
 Flo Rida – Turn Around (5,4,3,2,1) (Nicky Romero Remix)
 David Guetta featuring Flo Rida and Nicki Minaj – Where Them Girls At (Nicky Romero Remix)
 Enrique Iglesias and Usher featuring Lil Wayne – Dirty Dancer (Nicky Romero Club Mix)
 Junkie XL – Molly's E (Nicky Romero Dub Remix)
 David Guetta featuring Usher – Without You (Nicky Romero Remix)
 Erick Morillo and Eddie Thoneick featuring Shawnee Taylor – Stronger (Nicky Romero Remix)
 David Guetta featuring Sia – Titanium (Nicky Romero Remix)
 Tonite Only – Haters Gonna Hate (Nicky Romero 'Out of Space' Remix)
 Kelly Clarkson – What Doesn't Kill You (Stronger) (Nicky Romero Remix)
 Daft Punk - Aerodynamic (Nicky Romero Bootleg)

2012
 Madonna featuring Nicki Minaj and M.I.A. – Give Me All Your Luvin' (Nicky Romero Remix)
 Eva Simons – I Don't Like You (Nicky Romero Remix)
 Anakyn – Point Blank (Nicky Romero Edit)

2013
 Ludacris featuring David Guetta and Usher – Rest of My Life (Nicky Romero Remix)
 Calvin Harris featuring Ellie Goulding – I Need Your Love (Nicky Romero Remix)
 Zedd featuring Hayley Williams – Stay The Night (Nicky Romero Remix)
 R3hab and Lucky Date – Rip It Up (Nicky Romero Edit)

2014
 John Christian – Next Level (Nicky Romero Edit)
 Cygnus X – Superstring (Nicky Romero 2014 Rework)

2015
 One Direction – 18 (Nicky Romero Remix)
 Magnificence and Alec Maire featuring Brooke Forman – Heartbeat (Nicky Romero Edit)

2017
 Martin Garrix and David Guetta featuring Jamie Scott and Romy Dya – So Far Away (Nicky Romero Remix)
 Linkin Park featuring Kiiara – Heavy (Nicky Romero Remix)
 Trilane and YARO featuring Max Landry – Miss Out (Nicky Romero Edit)
 Stadiumx and Taylr Renee – Howl at the Moon (Nicky Romero Remix)
 SWACQ – Love (Nicky Romero Edit)
 The Chainsmokers – Young (Nicky Romero Remix)

2018
 Nicky Romero with Rozes – Where Would We Be (Nicky Romero Edit)
 Afrojack and Jewelz & Sparks – One More Day (Nicky Romero Remix)
 Nicky Romero and Taio Cruz – Me on You (Nicky Romero Edit)
 Martin Garrix featuring Mike Yung – Dreamer (Nicky Romero Remix)
 Jess Glynne – Thursday (Nicky Romero Remix)
Steve Aoki featuring Ina Wroldsen - Lie To Me (Nicky Romero Remix)

2019
 Kygo and Rita Ora - Carry On (Nicky Romero Remix)
 David Guetta featuring Raye - Stay (Don't Go Away) (Nicky Romero Remix)
 Trilane - Never Forget (Nicky Romero Edit)
 Armin van Buuren featuring Ne-Yo - Unlove You (Nicky Romero Remix)

2020
 Martin Garrix featuring Clinton Kane - "Drown" (Nicky Romero Edit)
 Robin Schulz featuring Alida - "In Your Eyes" (Nicky Romero Remix)
 Teamworx, Mr. Sid and George Z - "Techno" (Nicky Romero Edit)
 Nicky Romero - "Toulouse" (2020 Edit)
 Afrojack and David Guetta - "Hero" (Nicky Romero Remix)
 John Dahlbäck - "Pyramid" (Nicky Romero Remix)

References 

Discographies of Dutch artists
Electronic music discographies
House music discographies